Carlton Food Network (later known as Taste CFN from May 2001) was a British pay television digital terrestrial channel, owned by Carlton Television. It launched at midday on 1 September 1996 and closed on 1 December 2001. It was part of a group of non-terrestrial channels operated by Carlton, which also included Carlton Select – with whom Carlton Food Network time-shared space with – Carlton World, Carlton Kids, and Carlton Cinema.

The channel was also available via the PanAmSat's PAS-4 satellite in Europe, the Middle East and Africa on the South African DStv service.

History
Carlton Food Network launched on 1 September 1996 on cable. It originally broadcast on weekday afternoons, broadcasting from 12noon until 5pm, and shared space with SelecTV, which was subsequently bought by Carlton and renamed Carlton Select. It began broadcasting on the ONdigital (later ITV Digital) platform at its launch in November 1998, which was part owned by Carlton along with another ITV company Granada, who also operated its own group of Granada branded channels under a partnership with Sky known as Granada Sky Broadcasting. In early 2000, Carlton Select was closed down and its hours on ONdigital were given over to Carlton Food Network resulting in CFN becoming a full-time channel. However the channel remained a daytime only service on cable with Carlton Cinema airing during the evenings in place of Carlton Select.

The Taste era
In September 2000, Carlton announced it had a signed a joint venture with the supermarket chain Sainsbury's to co-brand the channel. The deal saw the announcement of interactive services for digital TV viewers that would allow them to order recipe ingredients from Sainsbury's through their set-top box. The rebranding took place the following May, with the channel becoming Taste CFN and the launch of the taste.co.uk website, merging Carlton's SimplyFood and Sainsbury's tasteforlife websites. The channel was now promoted by Sainsbury's both in-store and on its website.

However, the partnership was brief, and it was announced in August 2001 that the venture was to be disbanded on 1 September. Less than expected revenues from e-commerce and a weakened advertising market were blamed on the decision to close the venture, which saw the return of ownership of the Taste CFN channel back to Carlton and the return of the web-based recipe and wine assets to Sainsbury's, with the taste.co.uk website being shut down and its assets being reused by Sainsbury's own websites.

Although Carlton returned ownership of Taste CFN as part of the venture disbanding, Carlton decided to close the channel and it ceased broadcasting on 1 December. The final day of transmission for the channel was full of never-before-seen programming. At 23:58, Taste CFN aired a farewell montage of clips from the programming aired all throughout its five years of operation, followed by a final airing of its ident, with a closing announcement:

Afterward, before a final fade-out, this caption appeared on-screen:

On ITV Digital, it was anticipated that the slot was to be filled by a new channel on the now struggling platform, but in the end, the space became a preview channel for ITV Digital suppliers and potential customers.

Post closure
Less than a month before the closure of the channel, a new food and cookery channel from the UKTV network began broadcasting, UK Food, a spin-off channel from UK Style. Later known as the Good Food Channel before closedown, the channel has been known to broadcast former CFN programming, including original programming that was made for CFN such as Use Your Loaf, co-hosted by James Martin and Paul Hollywood. Good Food closed on 11 September 2019 due to Discovery taking control of the channel and deciding to merge it with the Food Network.

Programming
The channel broadcast food and cookery programmes and showcased the best of Carlton and other ITV cookery programmes. It also broadcast a weekday food magazine show called Food Network Daily, which was shown several times each day.

See also
 Carlton Television

References

External links
Carlton Food Network at TVARK

Carlton Television
Defunct television channels in the United Kingdom
Television channels and stations established in 1996
Television channels and stations disestablished in 2001